NPO Avtomatiki - State Enterprise Scientific Production Association Of Automation is a company based in Yekaterinburg, Russia. It is currently a Roscosmos subsidiary.

The Scientific Production Association of Automation is a developer and producer of electronic control systems for missile complexes. It has a long line of civil electronics equipment, among which are communications systems, industrial computer-assisted management systems, and medical equipment. The Association includes the Scientific Research Institute of Automation and the Plant of Automation.

References

External links
 Official website

Manufacturing companies based in Yekaterinburg
Roscosmos divisions and subsidiaries
Ministry of the Aviation Industry (Soviet Union)
Aerospace companies of the Soviet Union
Electronics companies of the Soviet Union